In eight-dimensional geometry, a truncated 8-orthoplex is a convex uniform 8-polytope, being a truncation of the regular 8-orthoplex.

There are 7 truncation for the 8-orthoplex. Vertices of the truncation 8-orthoplex are located as pairs on the edge of the 8-orthoplex. Vertices of the bitruncated 8-orthoplex are located on the triangular faces of the 8-orthoplex. Vertices of the tritruncated 7-orthoplex are located inside the tetrahedral cells of the 8-orthoplex. The final truncations are best expressed relative to the 8-cube.

Truncated 8-orthoplex

Alternate names 
 Truncated octacross (acronym tek) (Jonthan Bowers)

Construction 

There are two Coxeter groups associated with the truncated 8-orthoplex, one with the C8 or [4,3,3,3,3,3,3] Coxeter group, and a lower symmetry with the D8 or [35,1,1] Coxeter group.

Coordinates 
Cartesian coordinates for the vertices of a truncated 8-orthoplex, centered at the origin, are all 224 vertices are sign (4) and coordinate (56) permutations of
 (±2,±1,0,0,0,0,0,0)

Images

Bitruncated 8-orthoplex

Alternate names 
 Bitruncated octacross (acronym batek) (Jonthan Bowers)

Coordinates 
Cartesian coordinates for the vertices of a bitruncated 8-orthoplex, centered at the origin, are all sign and coordinate permutations of
 (±2,±2,±1,0,0,0,0,0)

Images

Tritruncated 8-orthoplex

Alternate names 
 Tritruncated octacross (acronym tatek) (Jonthan Bowers)

Coordinates 
Cartesian coordinates for the vertices of a bitruncated 8-orthoplex, centered at the origin, are all sign and coordinate permutations of
 (±2,±2,±2,±1,0,0,0,0)

Images

Notes

References
 H.S.M. Coxeter: 
 H.S.M. Coxeter, Regular Polytopes, 3rd Edition, Dover New York, 1973 
 Kaleidoscopes: Selected Writings of H.S.M. Coxeter, edited by F. Arthur Sherk, Peter McMullen, Anthony C. Thompson, Asia Ivic Weiss, Wiley-Interscience Publication, 1995,  
 (Paper 22) H.S.M. Coxeter, Regular and Semi Regular Polytopes I, [Math. Zeit. 46 (1940) 380-407, MR 2,10]
 (Paper 23) H.S.M. Coxeter, Regular and Semi-Regular Polytopes II, [Math. Zeit. 188 (1985) 559-591]
 (Paper 24) H.S.M. Coxeter, Regular and Semi-Regular Polytopes III, [Math. Zeit. 200 (1988) 3-45]
 Norman Johnson Uniform Polytopes, Manuscript (1991)
 N.W. Johnson: The Theory of Uniform Polytopes and Honeycombs, Ph.D. (1966)
  x3x3o3o3o3o3o4o - tek, o3x3x3o3o3o3o4o - batek, o3o3x3x3o3o3o4o - tatek

External links 
 Polytopes of Various Dimensions
 Multi-dimensional Glossary

8-polytopes